Khokhlovka is a rural locality (a village) in Karachevsky District, Bryansk Oblast, Russia. The population was 53 as of 2013. There is 1 street.

Geography 
Khokhlovka is located 12 km northwest of Karachev (the district's administrative centre) by road. Beryozovka is the nearest rural locality.

References 

Rural localities in Karachevsky District